Thinley may refer to:

Thinley Dorji (born 1995), Bhutanese international footballer
Thinley Dorji (archer), Bhutanese Olympic archer
Thinley Norbu (1931–2011), modern teacher in the Nyingma lineage of Tibetan Buddhism, and patron of the Vajrayana Foundation
Alak Jigme Thinley Lhundup Rinpoche (1938–2012), Tibetan Tulku, former speaker of the Tibetan Parliament in Exile
Karma Thinley Rinpoche (born 1931), master of the Kagyu Mahamudra, Sakya Lamdré and Chod traditions of Tibetan Buddhism
Jigme Thinley (born 1952), former Prime Minister of Bhutan
Karma Thinley, Bhutanese politician, member of the National Assembly of Bhutan

See also
Tinley